Future Shock! The Story of 2000AD is a 2014 documentary film about the history of British science fiction comic 2000 AD. Its world debut was at the 2014 Fantastic Fest in Austin, Texas, and subsequently shown at other US film festivals. Its UK debut was at the 2015 Edinburgh International Film Festival, and it had a limited theatrical release in the UK. It was released on DVD on 7 December 2015.

References
 Review at Den of Geek! website
 Judge Dredd Megazine #366

External links
 

2014 films
Documentary films about comics
Films shot in England
2014 documentary films
British documentary films
2010s English-language films
2010s British films